Stomopteryx flavipalpella is a moth of the family Gelechiidae. It was described by Jäckh in 1959. It is found in Portugal, Spain, France, Germany, Austria, Italy and since 2022 in Belgium.

References

Moths described in 1959
Stomopteryx